Saint John Airport  is an airport located  east northeast of the central business district of Saint John, New Brunswick, Canada. The airport is wholly within the boundaries of the City of Saint John. In 2018, the terminal handled 282,217 passengers.

Overview
Saint John Airport was officially opened on 8 January 1952, although several aircraft — including at least one scheduled flight — had already landed at the airport by then. The airport is classified as an airport of entry by Nav Canada and is staffed by the Canada Border Services Agency (CBSA). CBSA officers at this currently can handle aircraft with no more than 120 passengers. Part of the National Airports System, it is owned by Transport Canada and operated by Saint John Airport Inc.

Airlines and destinations

Passenger

Accidents and incidents
During 1976, a Douglas C-49J C-FHPM of Atlantic Central Airlines was reported to have been damaged beyond economic repair at Saint John Airport.

References

External links
Official site

Certified airports in New Brunswick
Transport in Saint John, New Brunswick
National Airports System